Rotary Club of SoHo Hong Kong is a Rotary Club under Rotary International District 3450. The club was chartered by Charter President Chris Tsang on 1 May 2012.

Grandmother Club and Mother Club 
 Grandmother Club: Rotary Club of Peninsula
 Mother club: Rotary Club of Tai Po Rotary Club of Tai Po

Sister Club 
Rotary Club of Hsinchu Chu-Chiann (新竹竹塹扶輪社)

Interact Club 
Tsang Pik Shan (Sung Lan) Secondary School Interact Club [曾璧山(崇蘭)中學扶輪少年服務團] was chartered in 2015 with the support of the school. Note: The school has been renamed as "Tsang Pik Shan (Sung Lan) Secondary School" since 1 September 2021.

Presidents 
 Charter President Chris TSANG (2012)
 Past President Polly YEUNG (2012–13)
 Past President Kirk YIP (2013–14)
 Past President Edward CHAN (2014–15)
 Past President Christina LEUNG (2015–16)
 Past President Edward CHU (2016–17)
 Past President Menza CHU (2017–18)
 Past President Jeffrey KWOK (2018–19)
 Past President Renee HUE (2019–20)
 Past President Joey CHENG (2020-21)
 Immediate Past President Eddy LO (2021-22)

Board Members (2022-23) 
 President: Winnie FUNG
 Immediate Past President: Eddy LO
 President Elect: Sarita CHU
 Vice President: Tak CHU
 Secretary: Sarita CHU
 Treasurer: Past President Polly YEUNG
 Service Projects Chair: President Elect Tak CHU
 Sergeant-at-arms: Past President Menza CHU
 Foundation Chair: Rtn Christina CHUI
 Interact Advisor: Past President Jeffrey KWOK
 International Service Chair: Charter President Chris TSANG
 Club Administration: Charter President Chris TSANG
 Public Image Chair: Past President Menza CHU
 Membership Chair: Past President Joey CHENG

Membership 
18 (as of October 2021). Members come from diversified classifications, including wholesale & retail - textile, building consultant, jewellery, fashion, finance, banking, occupational therapy, social service, education consultant, solicitor, barrister, event management, media management, information technology, manufacturing, etc.

District officers 
Members who have served the Rotary International District 3450 as District Officers.

Regular meeting 
Every Wednesday 19:30 at Lingnan Club, Central, Hong Kong.

Current service projects

Little Bunny Project co-organized with Christian Family Service Centre 
It is a service project serving the underprivileged families in Kwun Tong District. We set up a Little Bunny Letterbox which serves as a communication channel between our members and the kids from those families. We also organize social gathering and festival parties for the kids and parents.

Cantonese Talent Variety Challenge co-organized with Baptist Oi Kwan Social Service 
In order to facilitate social inclusion by learning and speaking in Cantonese, a talent competition is organized for kids and youth coming from those ethnic minority groups. Their mother tongue is not Cantonese. This was the first service project supported by District Grant, RI District 3450 ever in our club in the Rotary Year 2015-16.

Joint Service Project of Mental Health, Suicidal Prevention, and Crisis Management 
On January 8–14, 2016, at -30C temperature, in the ‘Joint Service Project of Mental Health, Suicidal Prevention, and Crisis Management’, Professor Albert Chan who was a Clinical Psychologist and Crisis Management Trainer representing Rotary Club of SoHo Hong Kong flew all the way from Hong Kong to Ulaanbaatar, Mongolia to provide training to Mongolia Rotarians, Medical Doctors, Police Officers, Teachers, Social Workers, Power Plant Seniors and Flight Tower Controllers, with the logistic arrangement provided by Rotary Club of Tamir. This project was successfully sponsored by District Grant in the Rotary Year 2016-17.

Water Purification System in Ningxia 

In 2017-18, our club applied for District Grants to donate a water purification system to a secondary school in Ningxia, Mainland China. The project ensures students can drink potable water meeting the hygienic standard.

Joint Club Mental Health Project for Students 
Jointly by Rotary Club of Mid-level, Rotary Club of SoHo Hong Kong, Rotary Club of New Territories, Rotary Club of City North, a symposium and workshops on topics of Mental Health were delivered from 8-9 Dec 2017 at HK Polytechnic University. It aimed at arousing awareness of mental health issues among students.

Area 4 Joint Club Walkathon to raise fund for Enlighten-Action for Epilepsy 
On June 20, 2020, COVID-19 postponed our Area 4 Joint Club Walkathon to a sweltering summer day. Members supported the walkathon with our passion. Altogether our club donated more US$ 1,200 to the event.

Micro-Fiction Competition (Memory. Gift.) 
This is a joint project and partnership with Hong Kong Alzheimer's Disease Association, Rotary Club of Bayview Sunshine Hong Kong and Rotary Club of Neoteric HK. Through this project, we hope to connect the youth with the elderly and help them understand more about dementia. This competition is a means to attract youth to participate in the dementia research and express what they have observed and learned in a micro-fiction writing. We have over 14 teams joining from 6 different schools.

Tablet Laboratory for Underprivileged families co-organized with Christian Family Service Centre 
During COVID-19 pandemic, online learning has become a new normal for students in Hong Kong. To cope with the needs on IT hardware and software, we have set up a laboratory in Po Tat Estate to provide direct service to the families.

Giving Mask • Rotary's Task 
With the generous donation by Mr Cheng, networked by the Rotary Club of Neoteric Hong Kong and Rotary Club of SoHo Hong Kong, District Health Committee distributed 150,000 masks (Level 3) to 4 different NGOs with diversified service clienteles today, including people with visual impairment, Mentally Handicapped, Elderly, Ex-mentally ill. Hope all the masks could reach all beneficiaries promptly.

End Polio Day 
Rotary Club of SoHo Hong Kong supports the End Polio Campaign. In light of COVID-19 this year, we adopted a free mode of End Polio Walk on the World Polio Day. Our club has donated US$400 to The Rotary Foundation to support End Polio.

Sponsored Scholar (2014-2015) 
Miss Jessica Cheung, a scholar of the Rotary Club of SoHo Hong Kong, was sponsored by the Rotary scholarship from Rotary International District 3450 to pursue a postgraduate study abroad in the year 2014-2015. She successfully completed a master's degree of Science in Architecture and Urban Design in Graduate School of Architecture, Planning and Preservation of Columbia University in New York. There were total 3 semesters (summer, fall and spring) in the one-year Master program. She accomplished excellent results and experienced fruitful learning opportunities by attending the course subjects and joining research studies.

Awards 
Members have received the following awards:

References

External links
 Rotary Club of SoHo Hong Kong 蘇豪香港扶輪社 Facebook
國際扶輪 3450地區 逾2000名嘉賓僑友歡聚一堂 訪問深圳 大公網 http://paper.takungpao.com/resfile/2012-06-26/B11/B11_Screen.pdf
支持蘇豪香港扶輪社 舉辦高級珠寶鑑賞—慈善貴賓夜 http://cdn.chowsangsang.com/group/mobile/chi/group-information/news-release/
喚醒公眾對基層的關注，世界綠色組織遂製作微電影「慳啲啦 Save it！」，假灣仔香港藝術中心舉行首映會  https://thewgo.org/website/chi/tag/%E8%98%87%E8%B1%AA%E9%A6%99%E6%B8%AF%E6%89%B6%E8%BC%AA%E7%A4%BE/
青年成就香港部(JA HK) 2015/16 贊助機構 http://www.jahk.org/sponsors-and-partners/?lang=zh-hant
商聚愛心號 https://mp.weixin.qq.com/s/duOGPs6qUUzoYHERZEZJjQ
Rotary clubs
Clubs and societies in Hong Kong